The Beast Reawakens (later prints carried the subtitle Fascism's Resurgence from Hitler's Spymasters to Today's Neo-Nazi Groups and Right-Wing Extremists) is a 1997 book by investigative journalist Martin A. Lee, in which the author discusses old-guard fascists' strategy for survival and the revival of fascism since 1944.  Special attention is given to ODESSA actions during the Cold War, international fascist networks, and political inroads to the right-wing mainstream. The book opens with a quotation from T. E. Lawrence's Seven Pillars of Wisdom (1922), a favorite of Hitler's favorite commando, SS-Standartenführer Otto Skorzeny.

Reception
Joshua Rubinstein, reviewing the book for The New York Times, called it "a vivid survey of fascist resurgence throughout Europe". Publishers Weekly described it as a "compelling, intelligent investigation, which reads more like a thriller than a history lesson".

References

External links
 Introduction to The Beast Reawakens by Martin A. Lee.

1997 non-fiction books
Books about the far right
Books by Martin A. Lee
English-language books